Somers may refer to:

Places

In Australia

Somers, Victoria

In the United States

Somers, Connecticut, a town
Somers (CDP), Connecticut, the central village in the town
Somers Historic District, in the center of the village
Somers, Iowa
Somers, Montana
Somers, New York
Somers Point, New Jersey
Somers, Wisconsin, a village
Somers (town), Wisconsin, a town

Other uses
Somers (surname)
USS Somers
Somers Limited, financial corporation on the Bermuda Stock Exchange.

See also
Sommers